Whitby Town F.C. was founded as Streaneshalch Football Club in October 1880, soon after its foundation the club changed its name to Whitby Church Temperance. The name was changed in late 1882 to Whitby Football Club and continued to play friendly games as well as competing in the Scarborough & East Riding County Cup. Whitby joined the Northern League for the first time in 1893 only to return to the Cleveland Amateur League two seasons later. They returned to the Northern League in 1899.

Key

Key to league record
 Lvl = Level of the league in the current league system
 S = Numbers of seasons
 Pld = Games played
 W = Games won
 D = Games drawn
 L = Games lost
 GF = Goals for
 GA = Goals against
 GD = Goals difference
 Pts = Points
 Position = Position in the final league table
 Overall position = Overall club position in the English league system

Key to cup records
 Res = Final reached round
 Rec = Final club record in the form of wins-draws-losses
 EP= Extra Preliminary round
 PR = Premilinary round
 QR1 = Qualifying round 1
 QR2 = Qualifying round 2
 QR3 = Qualifying round 3
 QR4 = Qualifying round 4
 R1 = Round 1
 R2 = Round 2
 R3 = Round 3
 R4 = Round 4
 R5 = Round 5
 R6 = Round 6
 QF = Quarter-finals
 SF = Semi-finals
 RU = Runners-up
 W = Winners

Seasons
In the non-league system where there is promotion and relegation there is the necessity for those in charge of scheduling matches to move some teams between different regional leagues at the same level to ensure as even a geographical spread as possible.

Timeline notes
Despite being promoted to Division 1 of the Northern League in 1900, the league season following only had one division due to the number of teams that left at the end of the previous season.
At the end of the 1901 season, the club left the Northern League.
When the club returned to the Northern League in 1926, they were known as Whitby United having merged with Whitby Whitehall Swifts. They would compete as United until 1949.
Even though the club did not compete in the Northern League in 1945–46 season, they were non-playing members and were eligible for the FA Cup that season. They lost in the second qualifying round at Stockton 0–4.
During the 1960–61 season, the club were deducted points for fielding an ineligible player.
The 1964-65 FA Amateur Cup semi-final against Enfield was played at Sunderland.
During the 1966–67 season the club were deducted two points.
During the 1972–73 season the club were deducted two points.
In the 1974–75 season, 3 points for a win was introduced by the Northern League.
During the 1975–76 season the club were deducted two points.
During the 1978–79 season the club were deducted three points.
During the 1978–79 season the club were deducted three points.
At the end of the 1981–82 season the league was expanded to two divisions.
During the 1989–90 season the club were deducted three points.
The 1996-97 FA Cup 1st round home tie against Hull was actually played in Scarborough. 
The 1997-98 FA Vase 1st qualifying round replay was a 3–3 draw in regulation time. Whitby won the penalty shootout 4–3.
The 1998-99 FA Cup 3rd qualifying round replay against Bedlington Terriers was a 1–1 draw in regulation time. Whitby lost the penalty shootout 4–3.
The 1999-00 FA Cup 3rd qualifying round replay against Lancaster City was a 2–2 draw in regulation time. Whitby lost the penalty shootout 4–2.
The 2000-01 FA Vase 1 qualifying round replay against Bishop Auckland was a 2–2 draw in regulation time. Whitby lost the penalty shootout 5–4.
At the end of the 2003–04 season the club qualified for the league play-offs but were defeated in their only match by Radcliffe Borough 8–7 on penalties after the match had finished 2–2 in regulation time.
The 2005-06 1st qualifying round tie away at Newcastle Blue Star was switched to Whitby.
The 2020―21 FA Cup 1st Qualifying round tie against Warrington Rylands ended 1–1 after regulation time, but Whitby lost the penalty shootout 4–3

References

seasons
Whitby Town F.C.